Katja Poensgen (born 23 September 1976), is a German former professional motorcycle racer. She was the first female competitor to qualify for a 250cc Grand Prix race. In 2011, Poensgen was inducted into the FIM Hall of Fame for her pioneering Grand Prix racing career.

Motorcycle racing career
Poensgen was born in Mindelheim, Germany as the daughter of the German importer for Suzuki motorcycles. She began riding motorcycles at the age of four. She started her motorcycle racing career in 1993 competing in the ADAC Junior Cup. In 1995 Poensgen rode a Suzuki RGV250 to become the first female to win the Junior Cup in Germany. That same year, she won the European Supermono championship riding a Suzuki DR650. In 1996 she competed in the German 125cc Championship. The next year she moved to German Supersport Championship.

In 1998 Poensgen made her world championship debut when she took part in the German round of the Supersport World Championship at the Nürburgring circuit. She rode a Suzuki GSX-R600 to a 20th place finish. In 1999 Poensgen began competing in the European Superstock 1000 Championship with a Suzuki GSX 750 R. In 2000 she rode for the Alstare Corona Suzuki Team in the same championship, finishing the season ranked sixth. She also set the fastest lap time twice and scored a second place result at the Misano Adriatico race circuit.

In 2001 Poensgen moved to the 250cc class in Grand Prix motorcycle racing.  She became the third female competitor in Grand Prix motorcycle racing history after Taru Rinne and Tomoko Igata. She began the season riding an Aprilia RSV 250 but, changed motorcycles mid-season to a Hardwick Racing Honda RS250R. On April 8, 2001, Poensgen became the first female competitor to qualify for a 250cc Grand Prix race at the 2001 Japanese Grand Prix. In 2002 she competed in German Superstock 1000. In 2003 she came back to Grand Prix motorcycle racing, without scoring points.

In 2004, she worked as a commentator on German television.

Career statistics

Supersport World Championship

Races by year

Grand Prix motorcycle racing

By season

Races by year
(key)

References

External links
Profile on WorldSBK.com
Profile on MotoGP.com

1976 births
Living people
People from Mindelheim
Sportspeople from Swabia (Bavaria)
German motorcycle racers
Female motorcycle racers